Russell Kowalyshyn (September 16, 1918 – April 17, 1988) is a former Democratic member of the Pennsylvania House of Representatives.

References

Democratic Party members of the Pennsylvania House of Representatives
1918 births
1988 deaths
People from Northampton, Pennsylvania
20th-century American politicians